Rectal bleeding refers to bleeding in the rectum. There are many causes of rectal hemorrhage, including inflamed hemorrhoids (which are dilated vessels in the perianal fat pads), rectal varices, proctitis (of various causes), stercoral ulcers and infections.  Diagnosis is usually made by proctoscopy, which is an endoscopic test. Bleeding from the anus is termed anal hemorrhage and is usually superficial in nature.

See also
 Lower gastrointestinal bleeding
 Blood in stool
 Hematochezia
 Fecal occult blood
 Melena

References

Gastrointestinal tract disorders